Lady Helen's Escapade is a short American comedy film produced in 1909, directed by D. W. Griffith. It is about the escapades of Lady Helen working as a domestic in a boarding house.

In 2004, the film was deemed "culturally, historically, or aesthetically significant" by the United States Library of Congress and selected for the National Film Registry.

Plot 
Lady Helen (Florence Lawrence) is a wealthy yet immensely bored woman who lives in a luxurious home with her three servants. In seek of adventure, she answers a help wanted in the newspaper and goes slumming as a domestic servant in a boarding house. She makes ludicrous efforts to cook, serve food, and clean, however the men living in the boarding house are enamored with her beauty and charm enough to overlook her incompetence. Among the boarders is a tall handsome violinist (David Miles), whose kindness and musical talent stand out among the crass manners of the other men. Helen and the violinist's romance inspires jealousy among the other maid, who conspire to get rid of Helen by framing her for the theft of the musician's violin. Although the violinist believes Helen is innocent, she is still fired and sent away. Helen soon reveals her true identity and reunites with the musician. After their reunion, Helen secures the violinist a position as a director at a conservatory.

Cast
 Florence Lawrence as Helen
David Miles as Violinist
Anita Henrie [sic, Anita Hendrie]
Owen Moore as Boyfriend
Dorothy West as Maid
Herbert Prior as Footman and Police
Mack Sennett as Dinner Guest
John R. Cumpson as Dinner Guest
Arthur V. Johnson as Dinner Guest
Vivian Prescott as Dinner Guest
Dorothy Bernard as Dinner Guest

Production 
As was the case with most of the films Griffith made during this period, most of the film's props and costumes were recycled from other productions. Lawrence, the film's star, creatively utilized the recycled costumes to stand out and support her character, and some writers credit her work in Lady Helen's Escapade as the first to use of costume design.

The film has a large cast that often appeared in the same scene—as many as nine performers appeared simultaneously in a single shot—so Griffith could not use close-ups to convey meaning and emotion. To compensate for this, the actors had to exaggerate their movements and gesticulations. As a result, much of the acting in the film resembles traditional stage performance rather than the more subtle performances associated with film.

References

External links
 
allmovie listing
Lady Helen’s Escapade essay by Daniel Eagan in America's Film Legacy: The Authoritative Guide to the Landmark Movies in the National Film Registry, Bloomsbury Academic, 2010 , pages 16–17 

1909 films
1900s romantic drama films
United States National Film Registry films
American silent short films
American black-and-white films
Films directed by D. W. Griffith
American romantic drama films
Films shot in Fort Lee, New Jersey
Surviving American silent films
1900s English-language films
1900s American films
Silent romantic drama films
Silent American drama films